Dawn of the Damned is the ninth studio album by the Swedish blackened death metal band Necrophobic. It was released by the music label Century Media Records on 9 October 2020.

Background
Dawn of the Damned was recorded at Chrome Studios in Stockholm, Sweden. It was produced, mastered and mixed by Fredrik Folkare. It was mixed and mastered by Andreas Vaple. Three music videos were released for the album for the tracks "Devil's Spawn Attack", "The Infernal Depths of Eternity", and "Mirror Black".

Reception

The album received mostly positive reviews. Dom Lawson of Blabbermouth praised the album saying "As with all enduring metal subgenres, black metal remains a hugely malleable thing, but Necrophobic keep proving that sticking to the script — and doing it with more intensity than just about anyone else — is still the most exhilarating way to plummet into hell's depths." Fraser Wilson of Distorted SOund stated, "The Swedes once again prove to be masters of their melodic blackened death metal niche, once again waving the flag for the Swedish mindset that brutality can still be catchy." While Nick Ruskell of Kerrang said "True, they’re not saying a whole lot new, but who cares? Being this good at something is good enough."

Track listing

Personnel
Necrophobic
 Anders Strokirk - vocals
 Sebastian Ramstedt - lead guitar, rhythm guitar
 Johan Bergebäck - rhythm guitar
 Allan Lundholm - bass
 Joakim Sterner - drums

Production
 Fredrik Folkare – producer, mixing, mastering
 Andreas Vaple - mixing, mastering

Charts

References

2020 albums
Necrophobic albums
Century Media Records albums